Gülhane Training and Research Hospital (GEAH), formerly known as Gülhane Military Medical Academy (GATA), was founded by Abdülhamit II in 1898 in Istanbul as Gülhane Seririyat Hospital. It moved to Ankara in 1941.

History
Gülhane Academy, which was attached to the Turkish army until 2016, has been a command training for the Turkish Armed Forces in the field of health sciences. Young medical officers and health technician petty officers graduated from here. However, after the 2016 Turkish coup d'état attempt, it was affiliated to the Ministry of Health together with the health units with the decree having the force of law issued by the current government on 31 July 2016 and its name was changed to Gülhane Training and Research Hospital. Higher education units affiliated with GATA were transferred to the University of Health Sciences.

After Bulgaria's alliance with Axis and the Axis invasion of Greece; when the government were discussing possibility of entering World War II, the government was decided to move the military schools and Gülhane from Istanbul to Ankara, and all the goods and personnel packed into a 28-wagons from Istanbul were transferred to Cebeci Central Hospital via Sirkeci, Istanbul.

Settlement and subunits
Gulhane Military Medical Academy Command and its affiliated units were located in Ankara, Istanbul and Eskişehir. Affiliated units until September 2016;

Ankara
GATA Command Headquarters
Gülhane Military Medical Faculty and Training Hospital
Health Sciences Institute
Research and Development Center
Biomedical Engineering Center
Center for Dentistry Sciences
Pharmacy Sciences Center
Air and Space Medicine Center
Post Graduate Doctorate Planning and Coordination Center
School of Nursing
Health NCO Vocational School
TAF Rehabilitation and Care Center

Istanbul
Haydarpasa Training Hospital

Eskişehir
Air and Space Medicine Center

Graduates

 Ali Rıza Pasin
 Hulusi Behçet
 Cevdet Kerim İncedayı
 Menahem Hodara

References

Hospital buildings completed in the 18th century
Buildings and structures in Ankara
Military hospitals in Turkey
Hospitals in Ankara
1898 establishments in the Ottoman Empire
Hospitals established in 1898
Defunct hospitals in Turkey